The Waco D Series was a series of military biplanes created between 1934 and 1937 by the Waco Aircraft Company for export to countries other than the United States. The three letter designation indicated the engine, airframe, and series. Armed versions had a -A suffix.

Variants
CHD  Multipurpose military biplane with 250 hp (190 kW) Wright J-6-7 Whirlwind radial engine.
JHD-A  Powered by  Wright Whirlwind radial engine. 6 exported to Uruguay.
S2HD  Multipurpose military export biplane with 450 hp (340 kW) Pratt & Whitney Wasp Junior SB radial engine. 1 exported to Cuba
S3HD  Multipurpose military biplane with 400 hp (300 kW) Pratt & Whitney Wasp Junior TB. 1 built.
S3HD-A  Armed variant of S3HD powered by Wasp Junior engine, one exported to Cuba.
 WHD  Multipurpose military biplane with 420 hp (310 kW) Wright J-6-9 Whirlwind engine. 5 built, including 4 exported to Nicaragua. Max speed: 191 mph, Cruise speed: 166 mph, Seats: 2
CMD  Multipurpose military biplane with 250 hp (190 kW) Wright J-6-7 Whirlwind. None built.

Operators

Cuban Air Force - One S3HD-A delivered in 1935. Lost between June 1937 and July 1938.
 Six JHD-As purchased in 1938.

Specifications (JHD-A)

Notes

References

External links
Waco Coding System: 

Military aircraft by type